Anil Devgan (25 May 1969 — 5 October 2020) was an Indian filmmaker, screenwriter, the son of Prem Prakash Devgan, and the first cousin of actor Ajay Devgan. He directed films such as Raju Chacha and Blackmail. He died at the age of 51 due to cardiac arrest at the night of 5 October 2020.

Personal life
He was born to Prem Prakash Devgan, was the first cousin of actor Ajay Devgan. He studied in Kendriya Vidyalaya in Delhi. From a young age, he had a creative mind fascinated by stories and had the passion to tell them. He was an avid music lover and was trained in tabla and martial arts. After graduating in 1989 from Shaheed Bhagat Singh College in New Delhi, he joined the film industry after being encouraged by Ajay Devgan and assisted on many movies with directors Sunil Agnihotri, Anees Bazmee and Raj Kanwar before making his debut as a director in 2000. He was married and had one son.

Filmography

References

External links
 

Film directors from Mumbai
2020 deaths
Hindi-language film directors
20th-century Indian film directors
21st-century Indian film directors
1969 births